DZ, Dz, or dz may refer to:

Businesses and organizations
 Delftsche Zwervers, a Dutch student society and rover crew
 Delta Zeta, a college sorority in the USA
 Discovery Zone, an American children's entertainment business from 1989 to 2001 and currently since 2020.
Donghai Airlines, the IATA code for this airline.

In language
 Dz (digraph), used in Polish, Kashubian, Macedonian, Slovak, Esperanto, Hungarian, Dene Suline (Chipewyan) and Cantonese Pinyin
 Dzongkha (ISO 639 alpha-2 code)

People
 John Drewienkiewicz, British soldier
 Dolph Ziggler, American professional wrestler

In science and technology
 dz, in calculus, notation for the differential of a variable z
 DZ, METAR code for drizzle

Other uses
 Algeria (ISO 3166-1 country code)
 .dz, Algeria's internet country code top-level domain (ccTLD)
 DZ-manga, comic books originally published in Algeria that draw inspiration from Japanese manga
 Demilitarized zone, a buffer zone between military powers
 Dragonball Z, a TV series
 Drop zone, as in a parachuting drop zone
 contraction for dozen